Hendrix is a 2000 biographical television film directed by Leon Ichaso about the life of Jimi Hendrix. It stars Wood Harris as Hendrix. It was nominated for a Primetime Emmy Award for editing in 2001.

Cast
 Wood Harris as Jimi Hendrix
 Billy Zane as Michael Jeffrey
 Dorian Harewood as Al Hendrix
 Christian Potenza as Chas Chandler
 Vivica A. Fox as Faye Pridgeon
 Kris Holden-Ried as Noel Redding
 Christopher Ralph as Mitch Mitchell
 Michie Mee as Devon Wilson
 Ann Marin as Linda Keith
 Kevin Hanchard as Little Richard
 Derek Aasland as Ginger Baker

References

External links
 

2000 television films
2000 films
Biographical films about musicians
Cultural depictions of Jimi Hendrix
Films set in the 1950s
Films set in the 1960s
Films set in the 1970s
Original Film films
Films directed by Leon Ichaso